Petersbach is a commune in the Bas-Rhin department in Grand Est in north-eastern France.

Peteresbach is within the Northern Vosges Regional Nature Park (French: Parc naturel régional des Vosges du Nord) that lies in the northern foothills of the Vosges Mountains.

Industry/Economy
At the eastern end of the town is the headquarters and major plant for :fr:Grands Chais de France, a major French wine and spirit maker and exporter. It produces over 1m bottles of wine annually.

Culture
The local cultural ties to Germany are strong, including the use of a Rhenish Franconian dialect.

See also
 Communes of the Bas-Rhin department

References

Communes of Bas-Rhin